is a Japanese professional baseball catcher for the Orix Buffaloes in Japan's Nippon Professional Baseball.

External links

NPB stats

1990 births
Living people
Baseball people from Hokkaido
Tokai University alumni
Nippon Professional Baseball catchers
Japanese baseball players
Orix Buffaloes players
Hokkaido Nippon-Ham Fighters players
People from Chitose, Hokkaido